Józef Roszyński (born August 18, 1962 in Nidzica) is a Polish clergyman and bishop for the Roman Catholic Diocese of Wewak. He was appointed bishop in 2015.

See also
Catholic Church in Oceania

References

Polish Roman Catholic bishops
Roman Catholic bishops of Wewak
Living people
1962 births
People from Nidzica